Gozdów  is a village in the administrative district of Gmina Werbkowice, within Hrubieszów County, Lublin Voivodeship, in eastern Poland.

The village has a population of 816.

References

Villages in Hrubieszów County